Hari Mohan Nath Kunzru (born 1969) is a British novelist and journalist. He is the author of the novels The Impressionist, Transmission, My Revolutions, Gods Without Men, White Tears and Red Pill. His work has been translated into twenty languages.

Early life and education 
Kunzru was born in London to an Indian Kashmiri Pandit father and a British mother. He  grew up in Essex and educated at Bancroft's School. He studied English at Wadham College, Oxford, then gained an MA in Philosophy and Literature from University of Warwick. In his teens, Kunzru decided that he did not believe in formal religion or God, and is "opposed to how religion is used to police people."

Career 
From 1995 to 1997 he worked on Wired UK. Since 1998, he has worked as a travel journalist, writing for such newspapers as The Guardian and The Daily Telegraph, was travel correspondent for Time Out magazine, and worked as a TV presenter interviewing artists for the Sky TV electronic arts programme The Lounge. From 1999–2004 he was also music editor of Wallpaper* magazine and since 1995 he has been a contributing editor to Mute, the culture and technology magazine. His first novel, The Impressionist (2003), had a £1 million-plus advance and was well received critically with excellent sales. His second novel, Transmission, was published in the summer of 2004. In 2005 he published the short story collection Noise. His third novel, My Revolutions, was published in August 2007. His fourth novel, Gods Without Men, was released in August 2011. Set in the American south-west, it is a fractured story about multiple characters across time. It has been compared to David Mitchell's Cloud Atlas.

In 2004 the "supersonic supernatural drama" Sound Mirrors was dramatised as part of the BBC Radio 3 drama strand, The Wire. It was a collaboration between Kunzru and DJ producers, Coldcut.

Although he was also awarded The John Llewellyn Rhys prize for writers under 35, the second oldest literary prize in the UK, he turned it down on the grounds that it was backed by the Mail on Sunday whose "hostility towards black and Asian people" he felt was unacceptable. In a statement read out on his behalf, he stated, "As the child of an immigrant, I am only too aware of the poisonous effect of the Mail's editorial line ... The atmosphere of prejudice it fosters translates into violence, and I have no wish to profit from it." He further went on to recommend that the award money be donated to the charity Refugee Council.

He is Deputy President of English PEN.

In 2009, he donated the short story "Kaltes klares Wasser" to Oxfam's Ox-Tales project, four collections of UK stories written by 38 authors. Kunzru's story was published in the Water collection.

In 2012 at the Jaipur Literature Festival he, along with three other authors, Ruchir Joshi, Jeet Thayil and Amitava Kumar, risked arrest by reading excerpts from Salman Rushdie's The Satanic Verses, which remains unpublished in India due to fear of controversy. Kunzru later wrote, "Our intention was not to offend anyone's religious sensibilities, but to give a voice to a writer who had been silenced by a death threat." The reading drew sharp criticism from Muslim groups as being a deliberately provocative move to gain publicity for the four authors. Kunzru himself admitted in an interview that he was asked to leave by the festival organizers as his presence was likely to "inflame an already volatile situation."

In 2016, Kunzru visited Israel, as part of a project by the "Breaking the Silence" organization, to write an article for a book on the Israeli occupation, to mark the 50th anniversary of the Six-Day War. The book was edited by Michael Chabon and Ayelet Waldman, and was published under the title "Kingdom of Olives and Ash: Writers Confront the Occupation", in June 2017.

Personal life
Kunzru is married to novelist Katie Kitamura, and the couple have two children. Kunzru is fascinated by UFOs and as a youngster often imagined a close-encounter type experience with them.

Honours 
1999: The Observer Young Travel Writer of the Year
2002: Betty Trask Award, The Impressionist
2003: Somerset Maugham Award, The Impressionist
2003: Granta "Best of Young British Novelists" (one of twenty)
2005: New York Times Notable Book of the Year, Transmission
2005: Lire "50 écrivains pour demain"
2008: New York Public Library Fellow, Dorothy and Lewis B. Cullman Center for Scholars and Writers
2014: Fellow, John Simon Guggenheim Memorial Foundation
2016: Fellow of the American Academy in Berlin

Bibliography 
 2002: The Impressionist. London: Hamish Hamilton. , 
 2004: Transmission. London: Hamish Hamilton. , 
 2005: Noise. London: Penguin. , 
 2007: My Revolutions. London: Penguin. 
 2011: Gods Without Men. London: Penguin. , 
 2013: Memory Palace. London: V&A
 2014: Twice Upon a Time: Listening to New York.  New York: Atavist
 2017: White Tears, New York: Knopf , 
 2020: Red Pill, New York: Knopf

References

External links 
 
 
 "Libya's Reluctant Spokesman: Hari Kunzru interviews Hisham Matar" – Guernica: A Magazine of Art and Politics
 Video of Hari Kunzru on Sky TV
 Podcast of Hari Kunzru discussing "My Revolutions" at the Shanghai International Literary Festival
 Podcast of Hari Kunzru reading from "My Revolutions" at writLOUD, London

1969 births
Living people
Alumni of Wadham College, Oxford
Alumni of the University of Warwick
British Book Award winners
Fellows of the Royal Society of Literature
English male journalists
Kashmiri people
21st-century English novelists
British people of Indian descent
English people of Indian descent
People educated at Bancroft's School
British people of Kashmiri descent
English people of Kashmiri descent
English male novelists
21st-century English male writers